The blue-black grassquit (Volatinia jacarina) is a small Neotropical bird in the tanager family, Thraupidae. It is the only member of the genus Volatinia. It is a common and widespread bird that breeds from southern Mexico through Central America, and South America as far as northern Chile, Argentina and Paraguay, and on Trinidad and Tobago.

This species is sexually dimorphic; the male is glossy blue with some white under the wing. The female is brown above and pale buff with darker streaks below.

Taxonomy
The blue-black grassquit was described by the Swedish naturalist Carl Linnaeus in 1766 in the twelfth edition of his Systema Naturae under the binomial name Tanagra jacarina. Linnaeus based his description on the "Jacarni" that was described in 1648 by the German naturalist Georg Marcgrave in his Historia Naturalis Brasiliae. The type locality is eastern Brazil. The specific epithet jacarina is derived from the Tupi language and was used for a type of finch. The blue-black grassquit is now the only species placed in the genus Volatinia that was introduced in 1850 by the German naturalist Ludwig Reichenbach. The genus name is a diminutive of the Latin volatus meaning "flying".

Within the tanager family Thraupidae the blue-black grassquit is in the subfamily Tachyphoninae and is a member of a clade that contains the genera Conothraupis and Creurgops.

The blue-black grassquit was formerly placed with the buntings in the subfamily Emberizinae rather than with the tanagers in Thraupinae within an expanded family Emberizidae.

Three subspecies are recognised:
 V. j. splendens (Vieillot, 1817) – Mexico to Colombia and east through Venezuela and the Guianas to the Amazon basin; also Trinidad, Tobago and Grenada
 V. j. jacarina (Linnaeus, 1766) – southeast Peru to east Brazil and south to north Argentina
 V. j. peruviensis (Peale, 1849) – west Ecuador, west Peru and northwest Chile

Description 
They have a slender conical black bill. The male is glossy blue-black, with a black tail and wings; the white inner underwing is visible in flight or display. Female and immature birds have brown upperparts and dark-streaked buff underparts.

Behavior 
Social monogamous, extra-pair fertilizations, intraspecific parasitism, and quasi-parasitism are commonly found. During the breeding season, males defend small territories, about 13,0 - 72,5 m2, dominant males are normally lighter.  The male has a jumping display, often performed for long periods, which gives rise to the local name "johnny jump-up". This is accompanied by a persistent wheezing jweeee call, jumping several times in a minute. The extravagant display also has a cost of call attention of predator, thus displays increase the nest predation. Predation are the main cause of breeding failure, and predator vocalizations can cause immune-related reaction to this species. Nests are small cups of rootlets (diameter about 7.5 cm) found at herbaceous vegetation 10–50 cm high,  clustered at landscape, and placed preferably at high complex habitat spots. Nests are built by both sexes.

Blue-black grassquits will often form flocks when not breeding. They eat seeds, mostly on the ground.

References

External links 

 
 
 
 
 
 

blue-black grassquit

Birds of Central America
Birds of South America
Birds of Trinidad and Tobago
Birds of the Caribbean
blue-black grassquit
blue-black grassquit
Birds of the Amazon Basin
Birds of Brazil